
Gmina Przelewice is a rural gmina (administrative district) in Pyrzyce County, West Pomeranian Voivodeship, in north-western Poland.

Villages
Gmina Przelewice contains the villages and settlements of Bylice, Czartowo, Gardziec, Jesionowo, Karsko, Kłodzino, Kluki, Kosin, Laskowo, Lubiatowo, Lucin, Myśliborki, Oćwieka, Płońsko, Przelewice, Przywodzie, Radlice, Rosiny, Rutnica, Ślazowo, Topolinek, Ukiernica, Wołdowo, Wymykowo and Żuków.

Neighbouring gminas
Gmina Przelewice is bordered by the gminas of Barlinek, Dolice, Lipiany, Pyrzyce and Warnice.

References
Polish official population figures 2006

Przelewice
Pyrzyce County